Shane is a 1953 American Technicolor Western film starring Alan Ladd, Jean Arthur and Van Heflin.  Released by Paramount Pictures, the film is noted for its landscape cinematography, editing, performances, and contributions to the genre. The picture was produced and directed by George Stevens from a screenplay by A. B. Guthrie Jr., based on the 1949 novel of the same name by Jack Schaefer. Its Oscar-winning cinematography was by Loyal Griggs.

Shane was the last feature film and the only color film of Arthur's career. It also features Brandon deWilde, Jack Palance, Emile Meyer, Elisha Cook Jr., Edgar Buchanan,and Ben Johnson. It was listed as No. 45 in the 2007 edition of AFI's 100 Years...100 Movies list, and No. 3 on AFI's 10 Top 10 in the 'Western' category.

In 1993, the film was selected for preservation in the United States National Film Registry by the Library of Congress as being "culturally, historically or aesthetically significant".

Plot

Shane, a laconic but skilled gunfighter with a mysterious past, rides into an isolated valley in the sparsely settled Wyoming Territory in 1889. A drifter, he is hired as a farmhand by hardscrabble rancher Joe Starrett, who is homesteading with his wife, Marian, and their young son, Joey. Starrett tells Shane that a war of intimidation is being waged on the valley's settlers. Though they have claimed their land legally under the Homestead Acts, a ruthless cattle baron, Rufus Ryker, has hired various rogues and henchmen to harass them and force them out of the valley. 
	
Shane goes to town alone to buy supplies at Grafton's, a general store with an adjacent saloon. Shane enters the saloon where Ryker's men are drinking and orders a soda pop for Joey. Chris Calloway, one of Ryker's men, ridicules and taunts Shane by throwing his drink on him, but Shane ignores him and leaves. On Shane's next trip to town with the Starretts and other homesteaders, he defeats Calloway, and then he and Starrett win a bar room brawl against most of Ryker's other men.  Ryker promises the next fight will be with guns.  Ryker hires Jack Wilson, an unscrupulous and notoriously skilled gunfighter. Joey admires Shane, much to his mother's chagrin, after Shane demonstrates his shooting skills.

Frank "Stonewall" Torrey, a hot-tempered ex-Confederate homesteader, is taunted and forced to draw his gun by Wilson, who then shoots Torrey dead outside the saloon. At Torrey's funeral, the settlers discuss abandoning their struggle and leaving the valley; but after witnessing one of their homesteads being destroyed in a fire set by Ryker's men, they find new resolve to continue the fight.

With the purpose of killing him, Ryker invites Starrett to a meeting at the saloon, ostensibly to negotiate a settlement. Calloway, no longer loyal to Ryker, warns Shane of the double-cross. Resolved to protect Starrett from an ambush, Shane intervenes, even knocking Starrett unconscious to save him. Shane rides to town with Joey following on foot to watch the fight. Shane kills Wilson, Ryker, and Ryker's brother, but is injured. Outside, Shane sees Joey, who notices that Shane is bleeding. In an iconic closing scene, Shane bids farewell and rides off into the valley, ignoring Joey's desperate cries of "Shane, come back!" Eventually the boy is heard calling “Bye, Shane!” as his hero disappears over the hills.

Cast

Production

Shane was expensive for a Western movie at the time with a cost of $3.1 million. It was the first film to be projected in "flat" widescreen, a format that Paramount invented in order to offer audiences a wider panorama than television could provide.

Although never explicitly stated, the basic plot elements of Shane were derived from the 1892 Johnson County War in Wyoming, the archetypal cattlemen/homesteaders conflict, which also served as the background for The Virginian and Heaven's Gate. The physical setting is the high plains near Jackson, Wyoming, and many shots feature the Grand Teton massif looming in the near distance. The fictional town and Starrett homestead were constructed for the film near Kelly, in the Jackson Hole valley, and demolished after filming was completed. One vintage structure that appeared briefly in the film, the Ernie Wright Cabin (now popularly referred to by locals as the "Shane Cabin") still stands, but is steadily deteriorating due to its classification as "ruins" by the National Park Service.

Ladd disliked and was uncomfortable with guns; Shane's shooting demonstration for Joey required 116 takes. A careful review of Shane's gun skill demonstration to Joey shows Alan Ladd firing with his eyes closed. Later, in the saloon battle, Ladd's pistol is pointed well away from the man he shoots, especially the final scene where he kills Ryker's brother. Palance was nervous around horses, and had great difficulty with mounting and dismounting. After very many attempts, he finally executed a flawless dismount, which Stevens then used for all of the Wilson character's dismounts and—run in reverse—his mounts as well. Palance looked so awkward on horseback that Stevens was forced to replace Wilson's introductory ride into town astride his galloping horse with Palance riding at walking pace.  Stevens later noted that the change actually made Wilson's entrance more dramatic and menacing.

The final scene, in which the wounded Shane explains to a distraught Joey why he has to leave ("There's no living with a killing"), was a moving moment for the entire cast and crew, except Brandon deWilde. "Every time Ladd spoke his lines of farewell, deWilde crossed his eyes and stuck out his tongue, making Ladd laugh. Finally, Ladd called to the boy's father, 'Make the kid stop or I'll beat him over the head.' DeWilde behaved."

Casting 

Director George Stevens originally wanted Montgomery Clift and William Holden for the Shane and Starrett roles; when both proved unavailable, Stevens asked Paramount executive Y. Frank Freeman for a list of available actors with current contracts; within three minutes he chose Alan Ladd, Van Heflin, and Jean Arthur. Shane was Arthur's first cinematic role in five years, and her last, at the age of 50—though she later appeared in theater, and a short-lived television series. She accepted the part at the request of Stevens, who had directed her in The Talk of the Town (1942) with Cary Grant and Ronald Colman, and The More the Merrier (1943) for which she received her only Oscar nomination.

When asked if he enjoyed the movie, the author of Shane, Jack Schaefer, replied, “Yeah, I did, all except for that runt", referring to the  Ladd. In 1989 Schaefer told the Oberlin alumni magazine that his Shane character was supposed to be a “dark, deadly person" who he had hoped would be played by George Raft.

Technical details
Although the film was shot using the standard 1.37:1 Academy ratio, Paramount picked Shane to debut their new wide-screen system because it was composed largely of long and medium shots that would not be compromised by cropping the image. Using a newly cut aperture plate in the movie projector, as well as a wider-angle lens, the film was exhibited in first-run venues at an aspect ratio of 1.66:1. For its premier, the studio replaced the 34-by-25-foot screen in Radio City Music Hall with one measuring 50 feet wide by 30 feet high. Paramount produced all of its subsequent films at that ratio until 1954, when they switched to 1.85:1.  Shane was originally released in April 1953 with a conventional optical soundtrack; but as its popularity grew, a new three-track, stereophonic soundtrack was recorded and played on an interlocking 35mm magnetic reel in the projection booth.

Stevens wanted to demonstrate to audiences "the horrors of violence". To emphasize the terrible power of gunshots, he created a cannon-like sound effect by firing a large-calibre weapon into a garbage can. In addition, he had the two principal shooting victims—Palance and Elisha Cook Jr.—rigged with hidden wires that jerked them violently backward when shot. These innovations, according to film historian Jay Hyams, marked the beginning of graphic violence in Western movies.  He quotes Sam Peckinpah: "When Jack Palance shot Elisha Cook Jr. in Shane, things started to change."

Reception

Shane premiered in New York City at Radio City Music Hall on April 23, 1953, and grossed $114,000 in its four weeks there. In all, the film earned approximately $9 million in theater rentals from the United States and Canada. By one estimate, that translates into about $20 million in actual box office receipts.

Bosley Crowther called the film a "rich and dramatic mobile painting of the American frontier". He continued:

Crowther called "the concept and the presence" of Joey, the little boy played by Brandon deWilde, "key to permit[ting] a refreshing viewpoint on material that's not exactly new. For it's this youngster's frank enthusiasms and naive reactions that are made the solvent of all the crashing drama in A. B. Guthrie Jr.'s script."

Woody Allen has called Shane "George Stevens' masterpiece", on his 2001 list of great American films, along with The Treasure of the Sierra Madre, White Heat, Double Indemnity, The Informer and The Hill. Shane, he wrote, "is a great movie and can hold its own with any film, whether it's a Western or not."

On review aggregator website Rotten Tomatoes, Shane has a 97% critical approval rating, based on 33 reviews.

Influence on later works
The 1966 TV series Shane starring David Carradine was directly based on the film.

The 1980 Japanese film  features a similar plot.

In 1981, British singer Kim Wilde released the song "Shane" as the B-Side to her single "Chequered Love". The lyrics, written by Wilde's brother Ricky and her father Marty, deal with the impressions of the movie

The 1985 film Pale Rider is partly inspired by Shane, with Clint Eastwood playing a mysterious stranger who comes to the aid of gold prospectors terrorized by a mining tycoon.

The 1987 post-apocalyptic movie, Steel Dawn, closely follows the plot of the of Shane, according to Walter Goodman of The New York Times.

In his 1997 album Arizona Bay, Bill Hicks parodies Jack Palance's role in Shane with track 8, "Bullies of the World", likening an unspecified "we", the arms producing countries, to Jack Wilson taunting the farmer to "pick up the gun".

In the 1998 film The Negotiator, the two leading characters have a discussion about Western genre films, Shane in particular. Arguing about the ending, Chris Sabian says Shane died, and Danny Roman says "he's slumped 'cause he's shot. Slumped don't mean dead."

In the 2013 Hallmark series Signed, Sealed, Delivered, "Shane, come back", was referenced.

The 2017 film Logan drew substantial thematic inspiration from Shane, and formally acknowledged the influence with a series of specific dialog references and scene clips. Shane's farewell words to Joey are recited, verbatim, in the closing scene.

Awards and honors
Academy Award
 Academy Award for Best Cinematography, Color: Loyal Griggs; 1954

Academy Award nominations
 Best Actor in a Supporting Role: Brandon deWilde
 Best Actor in a Supporting Role: Jack Palance
 Best Director: George Stevens
 Best Picture: George Stevens
 Best Writing, Screenplay: A. B. Guthrie Jr.

American Film Institute recognition
 AFI's 100 Years...100 Movies: No. 69
 AFI's 100 Years...100 Movies (10th Anniversary Edition): No. 45
 AFI's 100 Years...100 Heroes & Villains: Shane, Hero No. 16
 AFI's 100 Years...100 Movie Quotes: "Shane. Shane. Come back!", No. 47
 AFI's 100 Years...100 Cheers: No. 53
 AFI's 10 Top 10: No. 3 Western

Other
In 1993, Shane was selected for preservation in the United States National Film Registry by the Library of Congress as being "culturally, historically or aesthetically significant".

Copyright status in Japan
In 2006 Shane was the subject of litigation in Japan involving its copyright status in that country. Two Japanese companies began selling budget-priced copies of Shane in 2003, based on a Japanese copyright law that, at the time, protected cinematographic works for 50 years from the year of their release. After the Japanese legislature amended the law in 2004 to extend the duration of motion picture copyrights from 50 to 70 years, Paramount and its Japanese distributor filed suit against the two companies. A Japanese court ruled that the amendment was not retroactive, and therefore any film released during or prior to 1953 remained in the public domain in Japan.

References

Further reading

 
 
 
 
 
 
 
  CD-ROM.

External links

 
 
 
 
 
 Shane at Filmsite.org

1953 Western (genre) films
1953 films
American Western (genre) films
Films adapted into television shows
Films based on American novels
Films based on Western (genre) novels
Films directed by George Stevens
Films scored by Victor Young
Films set in Wyoming
Films set in the 1860s
Films shot in Wyoming
Films whose cinematographer won the Best Cinematography Academy Award
Films with screenplays by Jack Sher
Paramount Pictures films
United States National Film Registry films
Revisionist Western (genre) films
1950s English-language films
1950s American films